The President of the Federal Executive Council was the head of government of the Socialist Federal Republic of Yugoslavia, from the adoption of the 1963 constitution until the complete breakup of the country in 1992. Most non-Yugoslav sources referred to the post as "Prime Minister."

History
The 1953 Yugoslav constitutional law proclaimed the country to be a socialist state and abolished the institutions of Prime Minister and Government that had existed since the country's establishment in 1918. A new office of President of the Republic was created for Yugoslav communist leader Josip Broz Tito which would be both the country's head of state and would simultaneously preside over the new Federal Executive Council (FEC). The then FEC was fundamentally different from governments to date. It was made up of 30 to 45 members elected from the Federal Assembly with only five of these members becoming state secretaries for one of five secretariats (rather than ministries) and two or more members becoming Vice President of the Federal Executive Council. Government ministries to date were dissolved and their work continued by various Federal Administrations headed by appointed directors.

The 1963 Yugoslav constitution separated some of the executive roles of the President of the Republic and moved them to the new office of President of the FEC who would preside over that body. The President of the FEC would be elected by the Federal Assembly upon their nomination by the President of the Republic.

List

See also
 Chairman of the Council of Ministers of Bosnia and Herzegovina
 Prime Minister of Croatia
 Prime Minister of Serbia and Montenegro
 Prime Minister of Kosovo
 Prime Minister of Montenegro
 Prime Minister of North Macedonia
 Prime Minister of Serbia
 Prime Minister of Slovenia

References

Government of Yugoslavia